The men's 4 × 200 metres relay at the 2017 IAAF World Relays was held at the Thomas Robinson Stadium on 23 April.

Using the four turn stagger, teams were spread across the turn.  The best relative judgement of progress is against the stagger.  On the first leg, American Noah Lyles separated from Bahamas' Blake Bartlett to his inside and gained on China's Tang Xingqiang, while Canadian Gavin Smellie gained against Jamaican relay gold medalist Nickel Ashmeade to his outside.  On the second leg, American Jarrion Lawson passed China's Mo Youxue, making USA look like the clear leader as the international broadcasters called the race.  On the inside, Canadian Brendon Rodney had also passed Jamaica's Rasheed Dwyer.  Canada put their star, triple Olympic medalist, Andre De Grasse on third leg.  With USA the stagger leader on the outside, DeGrasse clearly was pulling away from everybody else and making up the gap to USA's Isiah Young.  DeGrasse's leg was the first time the announcers noticed Canada.  DeGrasse passed to Aaron Brown two steps ahead of the Americans pass to Ameer Webb.  Brown held that advantage to the finish line, with the Jamaican team, anchored by Yohan Blake, the second fastest man in history, trailing the Americans by 15 meters.

Records
Prior to the competition, the records were as follows:

Schedule

Results

Heats
Qualification: First 2 of each heat (Q) plus the 2 fastest times (q) advanced to the final.

Final
The final was started at 21:36.

References

4 x 200 metres relay
4 × 200 metres relay